The Orthopteran subfamily Aemodogryllinae contains about sixteen genera of camel crickets.  It was named after Aemodogryllus Adelung, 1902 - which is now considered a subgenus of Diestrammena.

Species can be found in Europe and Asia (Korea, Indo-China, Russia, China), although the greenhouse camel cricket is cosmopolitan and could be described as an invasive species.

Tribes and Genera
The Orthoptera Species File includes two tribes and lists:

Aemodogryllini 
Auth. Jacobson, 1905 - Europe, Asia (Korea, Indochina, Russia, China)
 Diestrammena Brunner von Wattenwyl, 1888
 Eutachycines Storozhenko, 1990
 Gymnaetoides Qin, Liu & Li, 2017
 Homotachycines Zhu & Shi, 2022
 Megatachycines Zhu, Shi & Zhou, 2022
 Microtachycines Gorochov, 1992
 Paradiestrammena Chopard, 1919
 Paratachycines Storozhenko, 1990
 Pseudotachycines Qin, Liu & Li, 2017
 Tachycines Adelung, 1902

Diestramimini 
Auth. Gorochov, 1998 - India, southern China, Indo-China
 Adiestramima Gorochov, 1998
 Arboramima Zong, Qin & He, 2021
 Diestramima Storozhenko, 1990
 Gigantettix Gorochov, 1998
 Megadiestramima Storozhenko & Gorochov, 1992
 Mimadiestra Storozhenko & Dawwrueng, 2014
 Tamdaotettix Gorochov, 1998

incertae sedis 
 Atachycines Furukawa, 1933 - Borneo, Indo-China, Japan
 Neotachycines Sugimoto & Ichikawa, 2003 - Japan

References

External links

Ensifera
Orthoptera subfamilies